Martin Roberts (26 January 1968 – 9 April 2016) was an English rugby union player who played for Gloucester.

References

Gloucester Rugby players
1968 births
2016 deaths
Rugby union centres